The men's high jump event at the 2002 Commonwealth Games was held on 28–29 July.

Medalists

Results

Qualification
Qualification: 2.21 m (Q) or at least 12 best (q) qualified for the final.

Final

References
Official results
Results at BBC

High
2002